Sebastien Bellin (born May 14, 1978) is a Brazilian-Belgian former professional basketball player. He has also been a part of the Belgian national basketball team in his career, he made his last appearance in 2010.

He was seriously injured at Brussels Airport during the 2016 Brussels bombings.

References

1978 births
Living people
Antwerp Giants players
BC Oostende players
Belgian men's basketball players
Brazilian men's basketball players
Centers (basketball)
Donar (basketball club) players
Dutch Basketball League players
Gent Hawks players
Kangoeroes Basket Mechelen players
Marist Red Foxes men's basketball players
Oakland Golden Grizzlies men's basketball players
Basketball players from São Paulo
2016 Brussels bombings